= Hidroconstrucția =

Company of Romania

Hidroconstrucţia
- Company type: Privately held
- Industry: Construction
- Founded: 1950
- Headquarters: Bucharest
- Key people: Emil Timofti (CEO)
- Revenue: 1,875 billions $ (2024)
- Number of employees: 19,004 (2024)
- Website: www.hidroconstructia.com

Hidroconstrucţia is a large Romanian construction company specialised in the construction of dams and hydropower stations. The company has constructed hydro power stations in Romania, Algeria, Germany and Iran with a total of 6,411 MW.

During its fifty years of existence the company constructed:

- 172 dams out of which 144 made of concrete with heights up to 168 m;
- 176 HPP with an installed power of up to 1050 MW/HPP
- 837 km. water headraces, having diameters of up to 7.50 m;
- 189 km. deviation canals and tailraces for the HPP;
- 495 million cu.m. of excavations in alluvia;
- 80.8 million cu.m. of excavations in rock;
- 474 million cu.m. of ballast fillings;
- 44 million cu.m. of rockfill;
- 40.9 million cu.m. of concrete above – and underground;
- 27.4 million sq.m. of drywalls for dikes;
- 5.7 million sq.m. of tightening walls;
- 539 km. of drillings and groutings;
- 355 km. motorways, national roads and other road rehabilitation;
- 212 km. country roads;
- 123 bridges totaling 6,320 m in length;
- 854 km. pipelines for water supply and sewerage;
- 283,000 sq.m. civil and industrial constructions.
